Ardisia panamensis is a species of plant in the family Primulaceae. It is endemic to Panama.  It is threatened by habitat loss.

References

panamensis
Endemic flora of Panama
Taxonomy articles created by Polbot